Christopher Patton may refer to:

 Chris Patton (born 1971), American actor
 Christopher D. Patton (born 1969), Canadian poet

See also
 Chris Patten (born 1944), British politician